The Pod is the second studio album by American rock band Ween. It was released on September 20, 1991, by Shimmy-Disc.

Production
The album was recorded from January to October 1990, at the Pod on Van Sant Road in Solebury Township, Pennsylvania. Recording concluded one month prior to the release of their debut on November 16th. The album was derived from two tapes titled the Bilboa tape and the Big Timmy Wasserman tape. Both tapes contain not only demo versions of songs on the album, but many outtakes not used on any album or tracks used on future albums. All of the songs have a muddy quality to them, due to being recorded on a Tascam four-track cassette recorder, and many of the vocals are manipulated in strange ways.

Composition
The album contains bizarre lyrical content, often attributed to the fact that Dean and Gene both came down with cases of mononucleosis during the recording of the album, as well as their alleged relationship with huffing Scotchgard according to Ween lore. However, when their fans began huffing Scotchgard, it was refuted by Gene Ween and Dean Ween themselves as being "the most slime-bag thing we could think of." 

Robyn Hitchcock is credited with "musical inspiration" for the track "Alone", which borrows elements from his song "Bones in the Ground".

Title and album cover
The album takes its name from the band's apartment where the album was recorded, which the band nicknamed "The Pod". The album's cover art is a takeoff of the 1975 The Best of Leonard Cohen cover; Ween simply positioned a photo of part-time bassist Mean Ween's head (wearing a "nitrous oxide powered bong" which is sometimes mistaken for a "Scotchgard bong") over Cohen's cover art, and altered the title text and other graphics. The copy of the Leonard Cohen record that Ween used had purportedly belonged to Dean Ween's mother.

Liner notes
From the Shimmy-Disc CD:

"Recorded by Dean and Gene Ween on a Tascam four-track cassette recorder between January and October 1990. All songs recorded at the Pod, where we lived for a year and 10 months (with our cat Mandee). The Pod was scenically located on Van Sant Road in Solebury Township, Pennsylvania. Our apartment was a haven for flies because it sits in the middle of a horse farm. In the time this album was completed, we filled up 3,600 hours of tape, and inhaled 5 cans of Scotchgard. This album was then produced and mixed by Andrew Weiss (our pal) at the Zion House of Flesh, Hopewell, New Jersey. Straight to DAT Mang. Mean Ween played the bass on "Alone" and that's him on the cover doin' up some Scotchguard powered bongs. We got evicted on October 1, 1991. But Dave Ayers says he's gonna help us out. Cover and art designs by Logarithms."

Promotion
The Pod produced three music videos. "Pollo Asado", "Captain Fantasy", and "Pork Roll Egg and Cheese" were included on a VHS music video compilation titled Shimmy-Disc Video Volume 3. Shimmy-Disc Video was a series of VHS tapes created by Shimmy Disc containing music videos from artists who were signed to the label. These tapes were never remastered or re-released, nor were the music videos.

Shimmy-Disc released a vinyl version of The Pod in 1991. It was also remastered and reissued by Elektra Records in 1995, after the relative success of Ween albums such as Pure Guava (1992) and Chocolate and Cheese (1994).

Reception

In 1993, the album was named one of the 20 best albums of 1992 by Spin. Trouser Press wrote: "Less inflamed and inspired than the first album (blame, perhaps, the five cans of Scotchguard the band claims to have inhaled), The Pod lurches, howls, fuzzes and strums through sloppy creations that are mostly one hit short of a high." Aphex Twin named it one of his 10 favorite albums of all time (making it one of two Ween albums on the list, the other being Pure Guava). In a 1999 review of the album, The Stranger called it "excellent" and wrote that "someday, classical music students will write dissertations on The Pod." Kerrang! wrote that "the electrified production on tracks like 'Dr. Rock' and 'Sketches of Winkle' is utterly unhinged, while the barking, aimless pace of 'The Stallion' (either part, really) feels like the sweaty blatherings of the most poisonous of drunks."

Track listing

Tour

Dates

Personnel
Ween
Dean Ween
Gene Ween

Additional musicians
Mean Ween – bass on "Alone"

Technical
Dean Ween – engineer, art direction
Gene Ween – engineer, art direction
Andrew Weiss – producer, mixing
Michael McGrath – art direction
Logorythms – cover art, design
Howie Weinberg – remastering

References

1991 albums
Shimmy Disc albums
Ween albums
Albums recorded in a home studio
Lo-fi music albums
Noise rock albums by American artists